The Dawn is a religious magazine printed and published by the Dawn Bible Students Association, East Rutherford, New Jersey and branch offices around the world. The magazine was first published in 1932 as a monthly journal, with the full title, The Dawn—A Herald of Christ’s Presence.

Content
The magazine includes articles about Christian life, prophecy, Bible study and biblical interpretation, from a  politically conservative Christian viewpoint.

References

External links
http://www.dawnbible.com (online Magazine The Dawn)

Christian magazines
Bible Student movement
Magazines established in 1932
Magazines published in New Jersey
Monthly magazines published in the United States
1932 establishments in New Jersey

ca:L'Aurora (revista)
de:Der Tagesanbruch
fr:L'Aurore (Étudiants de la Bible)